"Rugged-N-Raw" is the first single released from PMD's second album, Business Is Business. The song made it to three different Billboard charts, gaining the most success on the Rap charts where it peaked at 19. PMD's fellow Hit Squad members Das EFX contribute verses to the song.

Single track listing
"Rugged-N-Raw" (Original)   
"Rugged-N-Raw" (Remix)   
"Rugged-N-Raw" (Original Instrumental)   
"Leave Your Style Cramped"
"Rugged-N-Raw" (Solid Scheme Remix)

Charts

1996 singles
PMD (rapper) songs
1996 songs
RCA Records singles
Songs written by PMD (rapper)